Manhattan is a village in Will County, Illinois. The population was 9,385 at the time of the 2020 census. The U.S. Census Bureau estimates the population to be 10,037 . The community is located in northeastern Illinois approximately 50 miles (80 km) southwest of Chicago.

History 
Manhattan was incorporated in 1886. Due to railroad construction in the mid-19th century, many immigrants, especially Irish, moved to the area. It was eventually incorporated to obtain a saloon license. With roots in farming, the village has grown over the last ten years to accommodate over 6,071 people. Its forebears of German and Irish heritage give expression in the early spring festival Irish Fest.

Geography
Manhattan is located at  (41.422044, -87.981042).

Manhattan is located along the Wauponsee Glacial Trail that can be accessed at the Manhattan Road Access Point.

Demographics

As of the census of 2000, there were 3,330 people, 1,144 households, and 870 families residing in the village. The racial makeup of the village was 97.21% White, 0.21% African American, 0.12% Native American, 0.21% Asian, 1.17% from other races, and 1.08% from two or more races. Hispanic or Latino of any race were 3.02% of the population.

There were 1,144 households, out of which 46.2% had children under the age of 18 living with them, 65.6% were married couples living together, 7.3% had a female householder with no husband present, and 23.9% were non-families. 20.3% of all households were made up of individuals, and 6.6% had someone living alone who was 65 years of age or older. The average household size was 2.91 and the average family size was 3.41.

In the village, the population was spread out, with 32.4% under the age of 18, 8.0% from 18 to 24, 33.1% from 25 to 44, 19.2% from 45 to 64, and 7.3% who were 65 years of age or older. The median age was 32 years. For every 100 females, there were 103.7 males. For every 100 females age 18 and over, there were 96.3 males.

The median income for a household in the village was $55,559, and the median income for a family was $62,865. Males had a median income of $50,174 versus $30,865 for females. The per capita income for the village was $21,666. About 1.0% of families and 3.6% of the population were below the poverty line, including 0.7% of those under age 18 and 4.7% of those age 65 or over.

Education 
Manhattan is served by School District 114, one of the higher-achieving districts in Illinois. Three schools lie in this district. Wilson Creek Elementary School serves grades K through 2, Anna McDonald School serves grades 3 through 5, and Manhattan Junior High School serves grades six through eight. High school-aged students in the village attend Lincoln-Way West High School in nearby New Lenox, Illinois.

Civic organizations 
Manhattan is served by American Legion Post number 935 and the Lions Club. In addition, Manhattan is served by the Boy Scouts of America, Rainbow Council, Troop 155, and Cub Scouts Pack 155.

Transportation 
Manhattan has a station on Metra's SouthWest Service, which provides daily rail service to Chicago, Illinois (at Union Station). Manhattan is the southern terminus of the line.

Business 
Starcon, a major contractor in the petrochemical industry, is based in Manhattan. Starcon primarily provides maintenance services to oil refineries. The village is also home to Boing! Motorsports, an engine and chassis company specializing in the performance and restoration of antique tractors, ATV’s, motorcycles, and snowmobiles. Widely known for its fuel and air delivery tuning in both two and four stroke engines.

References

External links
Village of Manhattan
Welcome to Manhattan Illinois—Created by the Manhattan Chamber of Commerce. Learn about the area and its activities.

Villages in Illinois
Villages in Will County, Illinois
Populated places established in 1886
1886 establishments in Illinois